I Feel the Earth Move is a greatest hits compilation album by Martika released only in Germany in 1998.

Track listing
 "I Feel the Earth Move" – 4:13
 "Cross My Heart" – 3:51
 "Water" – 4:32
 "If You're Tarzan, I'm Jane" – 4:20
 "You Got Me Into This" – 4:11
 "Martika's Kitchen" – 5:09
 "See If I Care" – 3:42
 "Broken Heart" – 4:34
 "Mi Tierra" – 4:38
 "Spirit" – 4:39
 "Alibis" – 3:51
 "Take Me to Forever" – 4:36
 "Magical Place" – 4:42
 "Safe in the Arms of Love" – 5:09

References

Martika albums
1998 greatest hits albums
Columbia Records compilation albums